Amousse Tessema (born 25 September 1931) is an Ethiopian former cyclist. He competed in the individual road race and team time trial events at the 1960 Summer Olympics.

References

External links
 

1931 births
Possibly living people
Ethiopian male cyclists
Olympic cyclists of Ethiopia
Cyclists at the 1960 Summer Olympics
Sportspeople from Oromia Region